The University of International Relations (UIR) is a national public university in Beijing, China. It is known colloquially as "Guoguan" .

The Institute for International Relations, later translated into English as Institute of International Relations, was established in 1949 by the first premier of the People's Republic of China, Zhou Enlai, to train diplomats. It became one of the National Key Universities in 1960, and was one of first in China to offer master's degrees. In 1983, the school was the first foreign studies institute in China to become a comprehensive university. In 2021, the school was accredited to confer doctorate degrees for the first time.

The university's public admissions guide and the People's Daily indicated that UIR is affiliated with the Ministry of Education. However, some academic researchers and journalists contend that the university is affiliated with the Ministry of State Security, the country's principal civilian intelligence agency. A 1997 Zhejiang provincial government's official public announcement supported the latter claim.

History

The University of International Relations was founded in 1949 to train foreign affairs cadres for the newly created People's Republic of China. In 1961, the school merged with the Foreign Affairs College.

In 1964, then-Premier Zhou Enlai ordered the creation of colleges and university departments to focus on international affairs. Several government agencies, including the Ministry of Foreign Affairs and the International Liaison Department of the Chinese Communist Party, established their own institutes for the study of international affairs. The University of International Relations was formally affiliated with the Ministry of Public Security in 1965, and was charged with training intelligence agents for the Central Investigation Department (a precursor to the Ministry of State Security) and for Xinhua News Agency.

Like many schools in China, the University of International Relations was shuttered during China's Cultural Revolution and reopened in 1978. It was among the first institutions of higher education authorized by the Chinese government to offer academic degrees in China. The university began to offer a Ph.D. program in Politics in 2021.

Affiliation with the Ministry of State Security
The university's website, Chinese government, and Chinese Communist Party sources state that UIR operates under the direction of the Ministry of Education; however, the university does not appear on the Ministry of Education's list of subordinate universities. Many academic researchers and journalists contend that the university is affiliated with the Ministry of State Security (MSS), China's civilian national intelligence agency. 

The Historical Dictionary of Chinese Intelligence states that the university's "relationship with the MSS is intended to be covert". According to József Boda of Hungary's National University of Public Service, the "UIR gives the MSS a way to work with foreign universities and academics to shape and learn about perceptions of the PRC’s views on security. It also provides a platform for the MSS to identify talents, recruit officers and collect intelligence."

Partnerships 
The university maintains partnerships and exchanges with Marietta College, University of Massachusetts Boston, Aalborg University, Toulouse 1 University Capitole, Hiroshima University, Hiroshima City University, Ibaraki University, among others.

Notable alumni 
An Min, former Vice President of the Ministry of Commerce
Du Wei, diplomat, former Chinese ambassador to Israel
Liu Huan, artist, singer of the 2008 Summer Olympics theme song
Ma Jun, environmentalist, non-fiction writer, and journalist
Mei Feng, screenwriter, Prix du scénario (Best Screenplay Award) winner of 2009 Cannes Film Festival
Qin Gang, China's 12th Minister of Foreign Affairs, the 11th Ambassador of the People's Republic of China to the United States
Wan Fan (scholar), President of China Foreign Affairs University
Yan Xuetong, Director of the Institute of International Studies, Tsinghua University
Zou Jiayi, Vice Minister of the Ministry of Finance of the People's Republic of China, non-executive director of the board of directors of China Investment Corporation

See also
China Institutes of Contemporary International Relations
Jiangnan Social University

References

External links 

  (in Chinese)

 
Universities and colleges in Haidian District
Educational institutions established in 1949
1949 establishments in China
Intelligence education
Ministry of State Security (China)